Mishend is a village in Heyran Rural District, in the Central District of Astara County, Gilan Province, Iran. At the 2006 census, its population was 624, in 117 families.

Language 
Linguistic composition of the village.

References 

Populated places in Astara County

Talysh settlements in Gilan Province